The Eastern Caribbean Fed Cup team represents the member nations of the Organization of Eastern Caribbean States in Fed Cup tennis competition.  They have not competed since 2002.

History
Eastern Caribbean competed in its first (and thus far, only) Fed Cup in 2002, losing all five of its ties.

See also
Fed Cup
Eastern Caribbean Davis Cup team

External links

Billie Jean King Cup teams
Tennis in the Caribbean